Eulepte inguinalis is a moth in the family Crambidae. It was described by Achille Guenée in 1854. It is found in Brazil, French Guiana and in Jamaica, Cuba and Puerto Rico.

References

Moths described in 1854
Spilomelinae
Moths of the Caribbean
Moths of South America